Brachyiulus klisurensis is a species of millipede in the genus Brachyiulus. It was described by Karl Wilhelm Verhoeff in 1903.

References

Animals described in 1903
Julida